The Shady Dragon Inn is an accessory designed for the Basic Set or Expert Set of the Dungeons & Dragons role-playing game. It was published by TSR, Inc. in 1983. Written by Carl Smith, The Shady Dragon Inn is a supplement used to help dungeon masters introduce fully designed characters into any scenario.

Contents
The Shady Dragon Inn is a supplement of 118 pregenerated characters, appearing singly and in parties. The book includes a six-page floor plan of the Shady Dragon Inn in 25 mm scale. The book describes groups of non-player characters including fighters, magic-users, clerics, and thieves, various races, special characters, and parties of them all. This part of the book takes up the first 26 pages.

The idea of the supplement is to provide a dungeon master with either non-player characters to fill out a campaign or already generated characters for gamers to choose amongst to play in their own right.

Classes

Fighters
The book lays out twenty-three different fighters from Abel Artone to Vychan the Little. Each character includes a statistic block, a brief description of their equipment, a physical description, and a very brief biography.

Magic Users
Eighteen different Magic Users grace the pages of this accessory from Apris the Wondrous to Zarkon the Blue. Like the fighters, each includes statistic blocks and descriptions with the addition of the wizard's spell selection.

Clerics
Seventeen clerics grace the pages of this manual including everything from Ambrose the Celt to Penelope of West Haven. Like the wizards the cleric description includes known spells along with a description and general possessions.

Thieves
This class of character maintained the title of thief until changing to rogue in the third edition of Dungeons & Dragons. The supplement details fourteen of the thieves from Aiden Ablefingers to Zacharias the Nimble.

Races

Dwarves
Ten dwarves find their way into the manual from Astrid Helmsplitter to Ulf the Sledge. As with the others a statistic block and brief description comes with each of the characters.

Elves
An even dozen elves including Aithne of Far Isle to Torquil of Deep Hollow occupy this section of the book. As in the original Dungeons and Dragons system, all of the elves are magic-users and their spell books come with their descriptions.

Halflings
Begol Burrowell is the first of ten Halflings described in the tome and Wat Watershed is the last. Information about their background is included with a statistic block.

Others

Special characters
The thirteen characters presented in this section come from the Dungeons & Dragons toy line marketed at this time. Each includes a lengthier, but still short, description block and statistic area. Mercion the cleric is the first described here while Warduke, an evil fighter, is the last.

The Shady Dragon Inn
The inn itself gets a description near the end of the supplement along with the people found there on a daily basis. Prices for the various services provided by the Shady Dragon also come in this section.

In 1983, a follow-up article written by product author Carl Smith for Polyhedron Newszine provided additional details about the employees and furnishings of the Shady Dragon Inn (Smith 1983).

Parties
The last area of the book details group of adventurers, or parties, staying at the inn at any particular time.

Publication history
AC1 Shady Dragon Inn was written by Carl Smith, with a cover by Larry Day and interior illustrations by Jim Holloway, and was published by TSR in 1983 as a 32-page booklet with an outer folder. The inner side of this outer folder is printed with a 20" by 17" map of the Shady Dragon Inn (ground and top floor), with a scale of 1 inch = 5 feet.

Reception
Doug Cowie reviewed AC1 for Imagine magazine, giving it a positive review. Calling the accessory "very welcome", he nevertheless faulted the character sketches for their lack of information on treasure and other items carried. He also noted that the section on parties is "a waste of space" as it repeats information already provided elsewhere in the book. Cowie called the part of the accessory dedicated to the Inn "good stuff". He ended his review by noting that AC1 is not a must-have, but the inclusion of the inn - "an acceptable adventurer's base" - makes it above-average and "worth considering".

References

External links
Shady Dragon Inn @ Pen & Paper

Dungeons & Dragons sourcebooks
Mystara
Role-playing game supplements introduced in 1983